Bigo Live is a live streaming platform owned by a Singapore-based Bigo Technology, which was founded in 2014 by David Li and Jason Hu. As of 2019, Bigo Technology is owned by JOYY, a Chinese company listed on the NASDAQ.  

Bigo Technology has developed proprietary artificial intelligence and machine learning that is integrated into the application. The AI features are used to enhance user engagement and experience during live streaming.  

Viewers can support their favorite broadcasters with in-app gifts, and some popular broadcasters use the app as a full-time employment. Bigo owns Likee, the short video creation and sharing app.

History
David Li was a journalist prior to entering the technology industry, and Jason Hu had worked for many technology companies before the creation of Bigo Technology.  In 2014, Bigo was founded in Singapore. In March 2016, Bigo Live launched. It is available for iOS and Android operating systems.

In April 2016, Bigo Live was the most downloaded app in Thailand.

In December 2018, Bigo Live reached 26.7 million monthly active users.

In March 2019, the NASDAQ listed company JOYY Inc. completed the acquisition of Bigo Technology. 

In November 2019, monthly active users of the company's apps reached over 350 million globally.

In March 2020, it ranked 6th in the United States and 5th worldwide for streaming apps, based on total in-app purchase revenue.

In May 2020, Bigo Live launched a partnership with Bark, an online safety solution, to keep kids safe online.

In December 2020, Bigo Live announced a partnership with The Trevor Project, the world's largest suicide prevention and crisis intervention organization for LGBTQ youth.

In early 2021, Bigo Live had 400 million users in more than 150 countries.

In 2021, it reached 29.5 million average monthly active users in the second quarter of the year.

In 2021, Bigo Live ranked top 2 according to App Annie’s 2021 Top Breakout Social Apps by consumer spending.

Features 

 Streaming
People can live broadcast their life moments, show their talents and receive virtual gifts from supporters. 

Users can watch trendy live streams and they can filter out broadcasters from a certain country on the explore page. Users that meet certain criteria can create their own families. 

Users can broadcast and watch live streams of popular games, such as PUBG, League of Legends, RoV, Free Fire, Fortnite, Call of Duty, Dota 2, Hearthstone, Rules of Survival and more.

It signed on as a sponsor for Box Fighting Championship in 2020.

 Live Video Chat & Video Call

Users can invite friends to have a 1:1 online video chat, create group video chat or videos calls with up to 9 people in multi-guest rooms.  

With the match up function, users can initiate a random chat with people nearby or meet new users and possible become friends with them. 

Video filters and stickers are available for broadcasters.

 Live PK

Broadcasters can take PK challenges with other people. Those who get more points through gift-receiving win the game. There are 1:1 and team PKs. 

 Bar

Users can share pictures and short videos, add hashtags to their posts on bar, where people often upload clips and screenshots of their live streams.

 Virtual Live 

In 2021, Bigo Live launched its virtual live 3D avatars. Users can represent themselves through digital avatars created on the app. The ‘Virtual Live’ feature is developed using a blend of VR and AR technology to capture realistic facial expressions and mimic user movements as they livestream in real-time.

 Community

In 2022, Bigo Live announced the launch of ‘Community,’ a new interactive feature that allows users to create and manage online communities, as well as post and share original content with other platform users who share similar interests.

Controversies 

In June 2020, the government of India banned Bigo along with 58 other apps of Chinese origin, citing data and privacy issues and added that it was a threat to the sovereignty and national security of the country. The border tensions in 2020 between India and China might have also played a role in the ban.

In July 2020, Pakistan banned Bigo, and warned TikTok and YouTube over immoral, obscene, and vulgar content. The Pakistan Telecommunications Authority said the content on the two platforms could have "extremely negative effects on the society in general and youth in particular," without elaborating. The Pakistan Telecommunication Authority announced the lifting of the ban on 30 July 2020.

On 13 June 2021, the Criminal Investigation Department (CID) of Bangladesh Police arrested five people including Bigo's Operation Manager, a Chinese national, in Bangladesh for involvement in money laundering and blackmail. They were charged under the Anti-Money Laundering Act, Digital Security Act and Pornography Prevention Act.

References 

2016 software
2016 introductions
Social media companies
IOS software
Mobile software
Video software
Internet censorship in India